Dustin Lee Hoffman (born August 8, 1937) is an American actor and filmmaker. As one of the key actors in the formation of New Hollywood, Hoffman is known for his versatile portrayals of antiheroes and emotionally vulnerable characters. He is the recipient of numerous accolades including two Academy Awards, four BAFTA Awards, five Golden Globe Awards, and two Primetime Emmy Awards. Hoffman has received numerous honors including the Cecil B. DeMille Award in 1997, the AFI Life Achievement Award in 1999, and the Kennedy Center Honors Award in 2012. Actor Robert De Niro described him as "an actor with the everyman's face who embodied the heartbreakingly human".

Hoffman studied at the Los Angeles Conservatory of Music before he decided to go into acting, for which he trained at the Pasadena Playhouse. He received two Academy Awards for Best Actor for Kramer vs. Kramer (1979), and Rain Man (1988). His other Oscar-nominated roles were for The Graduate (1967), Midnight Cowboy (1969), Lenny (1975), Tootsie (1982), and Wag the Dog (1997).  Other notable roles include in Little Big Man (1970), Papillon (1973), Marathon Man (1976), All the President's Men (1976), Ishtar (1987), Dick Tracy (1990), and Hook (1991). 

In the 21st century, Hoffman has appeared in films such as Finding Neverland (2004), I Heart Huckabees (2004), and Stranger than Fiction (2006), as well as Meet the Fockers (2004) and the sequel Little Fockers (2010), and The Meyerowitz Stories (2017). Hoffman has done voice work for The Tale of Despereaux (2008) and the Kung Fu Panda film series (2008–2016). In 2012, he made his directorial debut with Quartet. 

Hoffman made his Broadway debut in the 1961 play A Cook for Mr. General. He subsequently starred as Willy Loman in the 1984 revival of Death of a Salesman and reprised the role a year later in a television film earning a Primetime Emmy Award for Outstanding Actor in a Limited Series or Movie. In 1989 he received a Tony Award for Best Actor in a Play nomination for his role as Shylock in The Merchant of Venice. He received three Drama Desk Awards for his performances in Eh? (1967), Jimmy Shine (1969) and Death of A Salesman (1984).

Early life and education 
Dustin Lee Hoffman was born on August 8, 1937, in Los Angeles, California, the younger of two sons of Harry Hoffman (1908–1987) and Lillian (née Gold; 1909–1982). His father worked as a prop supervisor (set decorator) at Columbia Pictures before becoming a furniture salesman.

Hoffman was named after stage and silent screen actor Dustin Farnum. He has an elder brother Ronald, who is a lawyer and economist. Hoffman is Jewish, from an Ashkenazi Jewish family of immigrants from Kyiv, Ukraine (then a part of the Russian Empire), and Iași, Romania. The family's surname was spelled Гойхман (Goikhman) in the Russian Empire.

His upbringing was nonreligious, and he has said, "I don't have any memory of celebrating holidays growing up that were Jewish", and that he had "realized" he was Jewish at around the age of 10.

Hoffman graduated from Los Angeles High School in 1955 and enrolled at Santa Monica College with the intention of studying medicine. But decided to be become an actor, leaving the next year to join the Pasadena Playhouse, although when he told his family about his career goal, his Aunt Pearl warned him, "You can't be an actor. You are not good-looking enough." He also studied with Lee Strasberg and has stated that he did not study with either Sanford Meisner or Stella Adler.

Hoffman initially hoped to become a classical pianist, having studied piano during much of his youth and in college. While at Santa Monica College, he also took an acting class, which he assumed would be easy, and "caught the acting bug". He recalls: "I just was not gifted in music. I did not have an ear." Now an aspiring actor, he spent the next ten years doing odd jobs, being unemployed, and struggling to get any available acting roles, a lifestyle he was later to portray in the comedy film Tootsie. Hoffman composed a song called "Shooting the Breeze", alongside Bette Midler who wrote the words.

Early acting career

Theatre
His first acting role was at the Pasadena Playhouse, alongside future Academy Award–winner Gene Hackman. After two years there, Hackman headed for New York City, with Hoffman soon following. Hoffman, Hackman, and Robert Duvall lived together in the 1960s, whilst all three of them focused on finding acting jobs. Hackman remembers, "The idea that any of us would do well in films simply didn't occur to us. We just wanted to work". Hoffman's appearance—Duvall described him as Barbra Streisand in drag—and small size made him uncastable, Vanity Fair later wrote. During this period, Hoffman got occasional television bit parts, including commercials but, needing income, he briefly left acting to teach.

He then studied at Actors Studio and became a dedicated method actor. In 1960 Hoffman was cast in a role in an off-Broadway production and followed with a bit part in his Broadway debut in production, A Cook for Mr. General (1961). In 1962, appeared in Rabbit Run Theatre's summer stock production of Write Me A Murder in Madison, Ohio and served as an assistant director to Ulu Grosbard on The Days and Nights of Beebee Fenstermaker at off-Broadway's Sheridan Square Playhouse. In 1964, Hoffman appeared in Three Men on a Horse at Princeton's McCarter Theatre and in 1965, in off-Broadway's Harry, Noon and Night with Joel Grey. Grosbard and Hoffman reunited for a 1965 recording of Death of a Salesman starring Lee J. Cobb and Mildred Dunnock, with Hoffman playing Bernard. He was assistant director for Grosbard's 1965 off-Broadway production of A View from the Bridge starring Robert Duvall and Jon Voight and in late 1965, stage managed and appeared in Grosbard's The Subject Was Roses on Broadway. Hoffman's "sharply outlined and vividly colored" performance in off-Broadway's The Journey of the Fifth Horse in April 1966 was followed by another critical success in the play Eh?, by Henry Livings, which had its U.S. premiere at the Circle in the Square Theatre on October 16, 1966. Sidney W. Pink, a producer and 3D-movie pioneer, discovered Hoffman in one of his off-Broadway roles and cast him in Madigan's Millions. Through the early and mid-1960s, Hoffman made appearances in television shows and movies, including Naked City, The Defenders and Hallmark Hall of Fame.

He starred in the 1966 off-Broadway play Eh?, for which he received a Drama Desk Award.
Hoffman made his film debut in The Tiger Makes Out in 1967, alongside Eli Wallach. In 1967, immediately after wrapping up principal filming on The Tiger Makes Out, Hoffman flew from New York City to Fargo, North Dakota, where he directed productions of William Gibson's Two for the Seesaw and William Saroyan's The Time of Your Life for the Fargo-Moorhead Community Theatre. The $1,000 he received for the eight-week contract was all he had to hold him over until the funds from the movie materialized.

1960s

In 1966, director Mike Nichols auditioned Hoffman for a lead role in the Broadway musical The Apple Tree but rejected him because he could not sing well enough and gave Alan Alda the part. But Nichols was so impressed with Hoffman's overall audition he cast him as the male lead in the movie The Graduate (1967). Hoffman played the character of Benjamin Braddock, a recent college graduate who has an affair with Mrs. Robinson, the wife of his father's law partner. This was Hoffman's first major role, and he received an Academy Award nomination for it but lost to Rod Steiger for In the Heat of the Night.

Although Life magazine joked that "if Dustin Hoffman's face were his fortune, he'd be committed to a life of poverty", The Graduate was a gigantic box office hit for Embassy Pictures, making Hoffman a major new star at the same time. The film received near-unanimous good reviews. Time magazine called Hoffman "a symbol of youth" who represented "a new breed of actors". The film's screenwriter, Buck Henry, notes that Hoffman's character made conventional good looks no longer necessary on screen:

Hoffman's success amazed friends from his early years as an actor, who told him "You were the last one I expected to make it". Biographer Jeff Lenburg wrote that "newspapers across the country were deluged with thousands of letters from fans", with one example published in The New York Times: "I identified with Ben. ... I thought of him as a spiritual brother. He was confused about his future and about his place in the world, as I am. It's a film one digs, rather than understands intellectually".

Turner Classic Movies critic Rob Nixon notes that Hoffman represented "a new generation of actors". He credits Hoffman with breaking "the mold of the traditional movie star and brought to their roles a new candor, ethnicity, and eagerness to dive deep into complex, even unlikable characters." Nixon expands on the significance of the film to Hoffman's career: "In The Graduate, he created a lasting resonance as Ben Braddock that made him an overnight sensation and set him on the road to becoming one of our biggest stars and most respected actors."

Hoffman, however, mostly credits director Mike Nichols for taking a great risk in giving him, a relative unknown, the starring role: "I don't know of another instance of a director at the height of his powers who would take a chance and cast someone like me in that part. It took tremendous courage."

Critic Sam Kashner observed strong similarities between Hoffman's character and that of Nichols when he previously acted with Elaine May in the comedy team of Nichols and May. "Just close your eyes and you'll hear a Mike Nichols—Elaine May routine in any number of scenes." Buck Henry also noticed that "Dustin picked up all these Nichols habits, which he used in the character. Those little noises he makes are straight from Mike", he says.

After completing The Graduate, Hoffman turned down most of the film roles offered to him, preferring to go back to New York and continue performing in live theater. He returned to Broadway to appear in the title role of the musical Jimmy Shine. Hoffman won a Drama Desk Award for Outstanding Performance.

Hoffman was paid $20,000 for his role in The Graduate, but netted just $4,000 after taxes and living expenses. After spending that money, Hoffman filed for New York State unemployment benefits, receiving $55 per week while living in a two-room apartment in the West Village of Manhattan. He was then offered the lead in Midnight Cowboy (1969), which he accepted partly to prove many critics were wrong about his acting range and the variety of characters he could portray. Peter Biskind wrote, "it was the very contrast between his preppy character in The Graduate, and Ratso Rizzo" that appealed to Hoffman. 'I had become troubled,' recalls Hoffman, 'by the reviews that I read of The Graduate, that I was not a character actor, which I like to think of myself as. It hurt me. Some of the stuff in the press was brutal.'" Critics assumed that director Mike Nichols got lucky by finding a typical actor with average acting ability to play the part of Benjamin Braddock.

John Schlesinger, who would direct Midnight Cowboy and was seeking lead actors, held that same impression. Hoffman's performance as a button-down college graduate and track star was so convincing to Schlesinger, "he seemed unable to comprehend the fact that he was acting", notes Biskind. To help the director, whom he had never met, overcome that false impression, Hoffman met him in Times Square dressed as a homeless person, wearing a dirty raincoat, his hair slicked back and with an unshaven face. Schlesinger was sold, admitting, "I've only seen you in the context of The Graduate, but you'll do quite well."

Midnight Cowboy premiered in theaters across the United States in May 1969. For his acting, Hoffman received his second Oscar nomination and the film won Best Picture. In 1994 the film was deemed "culturally, historically, or aesthetically significant" by the Library of Congress and selected for preservation in the United States National Film Registry. Biskind considers Hoffman's acting a major accomplishment:

Also in 1969, Hoffman co-starred with Mia Farrow in the Peter Yates's romantic drama film John and Mary. He received a 1970 British Academy Film Award for Best Actor for his performance in the film, although the film received mixed reviews. He was also nominated for a Golden Globe Award for Best Actor in a Musical or Comedy Motion Picture The film was made soon after the success of Farrow's performance in Roman Polanski's Rosemary's Baby (1968), and Hoffman's performance in The Graduate which prompted them being hailed on the cover of the February 27, 1969, Time magazine as stars of their generation.

1970s
This was followed by his role in Little Big Man (1970), where Jack Crabb, his character, ages from teenager to a 121-year-old man. The film was widely praised by critics, but was overlooked for an award except for a supporting nomination for Chief Dan George. Hoffman continued to appear in major films over the next few years. Who Is Harry Kellerman and Why Is He Saying Those Terrible Things About Me? (1971), Straw Dogs (also 1971), and Papillon (1973). He returned to Broadway in 1974, directing All Over Town.

Hoffman next starred in Lenny (1974), for which he was again nominated for Best Actor. Lenny was based on the life of stand-up comedian Lenny Bruce, who died at the age of 40, and was known for his open, free-style and critical form of comedy which integrated politics, religion, sex, and vulgarity. Expectations were high that Hoffman would win an Oscar for his portrayal, especially after his similar role in Midnight Cowboy. Film critic Katharine Lowry speculates that director Bob Fosse "never gave him a chance" to go far enough into developing the character. "We never understand what, besides the drugs he injected, made him tick like a time bomb", she says.

However, notes author Paul Gardner, "directing Lenny, his most ambitious project, exhausted Fosse emotionally and physically. It turned his life inside out", with shooting days often lasting 10 to 12 hours:

Hoffman initially turned the part down, saying: "I didn't think the script was strong enough and I wasn't sure I was the one to play the role." While considering the part, he read Lenny Bruce's autobiography and looked at films with Bruce performing stand-up to live audiences. In the same interview with Playboy he recounted: "I began to feel an affinity with him, a realization that there was a lot of Lenny Bruce in me. My wife felt it too ... I realized that I'd have to make use of my own spontaneity because he was so spontaneous. And I admired his guts ... That intimacy is what an actor tries to get ... It occurred to me that if I had known him, I would have wanted us to be friends ... and he was a provocateur, and I love to provoke." Movie critic Judith Crist gave Hoffman credit for the ultimate success of the film:

Lenny was nominated for six Academy Awards, including Best Picture, Best Director, Best Actor, Best Actress, Best Adapted Screenplay, and Best Cinematography.

All the President's Men (1976) was made less than two years after the Watergate scandal, and starred Hoffman and Robert Redford as the real-life journalists, Carl Bernstein and Bob Woodward, respectively. Based on actual events, Hoffman and Redford play Washington Post reporters who uncover a break-in at the Watergate Hotel and end up investigating a political scandal that reaches all the way to the presidency. The film, as earlier ones, had Hoffman take on a dramatically different character than his previous one (as Lenny Bruce), although both men, Bruce and Bernstein, set their faces against abuses of institutional power, and the tendency for society to ignore such abuses. Author James Morrison compares the two roles: "As Lenny Bruce in Lenny (1974), Hoffman plays a martyr to the cause of establishment oppression, while in All the President's Men, he plays a reporter exposing presidential malfeasance."

Vincent Canby of The New York Times described the film as "a spellbinding detective story". "The strength of the movie", he added, was "the virtually day-to-day record of the way Bernstein and Woodward conducted their investigations." The characters portrayed by Hoffman and Redford shared the rank of No. 27 Hero on AFI's 100 Years... 100 Heroes and Villains list, while Entertainment Weekly ranked All the President's Men as one of the 25 "Powerful Political Thrillers".

Hoffman next starred in Marathon Man (1976), a film based on William Goldman's novel of the same name, opposite Laurence Olivier and Roy Scheider. Its director, John Schlesinger also directed Hoffman in Midnight Cowboy in 1969. Described as "Schlesinger's thriller", by author Gene D. Phillips, Hoffman plays the hero, Babe Levy, a part-time long-distance runner and graduate student, who suddenly finds himself being pursued by a fugitive Nazi. To put himself in the mindset of someone under severe emotional distress, Hoffman did not sleep for days at a time and let his body become disheveled and unhealthy.

Goldman describes his inspiration for the novel: "What if someone close to you was something totally different from what you thought? In the story, Hoffman thinks his brother (Roy Scheider) is a businessman where the reality is that the man is a spy, who has been involved with the Nazi, Szell." However, Hoffman remembers a serious disagreement he had with Goldman, who also wrote the screenplay, about how the story ends:

Hoffman's next roles were also successful. He opted out of directing Straight Time (1978), but starred as a thief. His next film, Michael Apted's Agatha (1979), was with Vanessa Redgrave as Agatha Christie, focussing on the missing eleven days of the author's life. The part of Archie Christie was played by Timothy Dalton, then partner of Vanessa Redgrave, and later to star in James Bond movies. Dalton's depiction of cold indifference to his wife produced a perfect foil to Hoffman's portrayal of warm compassion, humor and sensitivity. The film had both romantic and comic moments whilst the overall plot cleverly mirrored one of Christie's detective novels. Agatha was generally very well received by critics, especially in the UK, and maintains an 82% rating on Rotten Tomatoes.

Hoffman next starred in Kramer vs. Kramer (1979) co-starring Meryl Streep and directed by Robert Benton. The film tells the story of a married couple's divorce and its impact on everyone involved, including the couple's young son. Hoffman won his first Academy Award, and the film also received the Best Picture honor, plus the awards for Best Supporting Actress (Streep), Best Director, and Best Adapted Screenplay.

The film required Hoffman to change his attitude, from being a "desensitized advertising art director" into becoming a "responsive and concerned daddy" after his wife (Streep) walks out on him and their six-year-old son, Billy. Hoffman, during the making of the movie, was also going through his own divorce after a ten-year first marriage. Hoffman has said, "Giving myself permission not only to be present but to be a father was a kind of epiphany for me at that time, that I could get to through my work. ... I got closer to being a father by playing a father. That's very painful to say." The role also reminded him of his own love of children in general:

Benton's directing has been praised by Hoffman, who credits him for inspiring the emotional level supporting many scenes: "Perfect directors make you emotional. On Kramer vs. Kramer, Robert Benton made me emotional. He was pulling so hard for me. When I didn't think I could do a scene again I'd say, "I can't give it to you, I haven't got it." Then he'd just get this look on his face and roll the camera and I'd say, "Okay, this is yours." That's what he made you want to do for him—to give him one."

1980s

In Tootsie (1982), Hoffman portrays Michael Dorsey, a struggling actor who finds himself dressing up as a woman to land a role on a soap opera. His co-star was Jessica Lange. Tootsie earned ten Academy Award nominations, including Hoffman's fifth nomination.

Under direction by Sydney Pollack, Hoffman's role demanded "a steady bombardment of opposites—edgy then funny, romantic then realistic, soft then quivering." To film critic David Denby, Hoffman's character "embodies vulnerability and drive in perfect proportion. He has the knack of making everything he does seem perilous, and so audiences feel protective of him and root for him." Hoffman's acting was made more difficult than necessary, however, as he was not given the rehearsal time Pollack promised:

Fellow actor Gary Oldman reported that, during a telephone conversation with Hoffman, the latter recalled having made comments toward a "very powerful" industry figure who ensured that he was unable to find work in Hollywood for some time following Tootsie. In 1983, Hoffman became a Major Donor for The Mirror Theater Ltd, alongside Paul Newman and Al Pacino, matching a grant from Laurance Rockefeller. The men were inspired to invest by their connection with Lee Strasberg, as Lee's then daughter-in-law Sabra Jones was the Founder and Producing Artistic Director of The Mirror.

In 1984, Hoffman starred as Willy Loman in the Broadway revival of Arthur Miller's play Death of a Salesman. He reprised his role in a TV movie of the same name, for which he won the 1985 Emmy Award for Outstanding Lead Actor along with a Golden Globe.

Hoffman first read the play at the age of 16, but today considers the story much like his own: "It was a blueprint of my family. I was the loser, the flunky, and my brother, a high-school varsity football player, was Biff." Author Marie Brenner notes that Hoffman "has been obsessed with the play" throughout his career: "For years he has wanted to be Willy Loman; when he discovered that Arthur Miller was his neighbor in Connecticut, they began to talk about it in earnest." For Hoffman, the story also left a deep emotional impact from the time he first read it:

Hoffman rehearsed for three weeks with the play's original star, Lee J. Cobb, and remembers seeing his stage performance: "I'll never forget that period in my life. It was so vivid, so intense, watching Lee J. Cobb and his sixteen-inch guns as Willy. God, how I think about what I saw on that stage!" Brenner adds that Hoffman "has been training like a boxer for the role that so exhausted Cobb he had to be replaced after four months." The original play was directed by Elia Kazan, who Hoffman considers "the perfect director, the best there ever was. ... God, I would have done anything to have worked with Kazan."

Hoffman's worst film failure was Elaine May's Ishtar (1987), co-starring Warren Beatty, who also produced it. Hoffman and Beatty play two down-and-out singer-songwriters who travel to Morocco for a nightclub gig and get caught up in foreign intrigue. Much of the movie was filmed in Africa. The film faced severe production problems, mostly related to its $55 million cost, and received overwhelmingly negative reviews. However, Hoffman and Beatty liked the film's final cut and tried to defend it. Hoffman and Beatty were unaffected by the flop, and Ishtar became a cult film. Quentin Tarantino, for one, has called it one of his favorite movies, partly due to the humorous lyrics of the songs written by Paul Williams. Hoffman describes why he loves the film:

Next came director Barry Levinson's Rain Man (1988), where Hoffman starred as an autistic savant, opposite Tom Cruise. Levinson, Hoffman and Cruise worked for two years on the film, and Hoffman's performance gained him his second Academy Award. Behind Hoffman's motivation for doing the film, he has said, "Deep inside, Rain Man is about how autistic we all are." In preparation for the part, Hoffman spent two years befriending autistic people, which included taking them bowling and to fast food restaurants. "It fed my obsession", he has stated.

Hoffman worked at the New York Psychiatric Institute, affiliated with Columbia University, when he was 21. "It was a great experience for me", he said. "All my life I had wanted to get inside a prison or a mental hospital. ... I wanted to get inside where behavior, human behavior, was so exposed. All the things the rest of us were feeling and stopping up were coming out of these people." He used that experience to help him develop the character of Raymond Babbitt, a high-functioning autistic savant, yet a person who critic David Denby described as "a strangely shuttered genius". Hoffman created certain character traits for Raymond. Denby noted: "Hoffman, looking suddenly older and smaller, has developed a small shuffling walk for Raymond, with shoulder bent. His eyes don't make contact with anyone else's, and he flattens his voice to a dry nasal bark."

Rain Man won four Academy Awards, including Best Picture, Best Actor for Hoffman, and Best Director for Barry Levinson. Having worked closely with Hoffman for two years on filming, Levinson offered some opinions about his skill as an actor:

After Rain Man, Hoffman appeared with Sean Connery and Matthew Broderick in Family Business (1989), directed by Sidney Lumet. The story centers on the estrangement between Vito (Hoffman), a middle-aged man trying to succeed in a legitimate business, and his "hopelessly corrupt but charming father", Jesse (Connery). Critics were mostly not impressed with the story, although the individual performances were praised, especially Connery's.

Because of their different acting styles and nationalities, some industry writers thought Connery and Hoffman might not work well together as close family members. "To the surprise of many", note Connery biographers Lee Pfeiffer and Lisa Philip, "the two superstars developed an immediate rapport and chemistry that translates onto the screen." And Lumet remembered: "Sean is extremely disciplined and Dustin is very improvisational, all over the place with his lines. I didn't know where it would end up, but Sean met Dustin improvisation for improvisation, and a great deal of richness and humor came out of it."

1990s
In 1991, Hoffman voiced substitute teacher Mr. Bergstrom in The Simpsons episode "Lisa's Substitute", under the pseudonym Sam Etic. As a reference to this episode, during the episode featuring the Itchy & Scratchy movie, Lisa claims that Dustin Hoffman had a cameo in that movie but didn't use his real name.

Throughout the 1990s, Hoffman appeared in many large, studio films, such as Dick Tracy (1990) (where his Ishtar co-star Beatty plays the titular character), Hero (1992) and Billy Bathgate (1991) co-starring with Nicole Kidman (who was nominated for a Golden Globe). Hoffman also played the title role of Captain Hook in Steven Spielberg's Hook (also 1991), earning a Golden Globe nomination, and the narrator in Dr. Seuss Video Classics: Horton Hears a Who! (also 1992); in Hook, Hoffman's costume was so heavy that he had to wear an air-conditioned suit under it.

Hoffman played the lead role in Outbreak (1995), alongside Rene Russo, Kevin Spacey, Morgan Freeman, Cuba Gooding Jr. and Donald Sutherland. In the film, Hoffman is a medical doctor who uncovers a newly discovered Ebola-like virus which came to the U.S. from Africa in an infected monkey. Hoffman races to stop the virus's spread and find a vaccine before it becomes a worldwide pandemic with no cure. It was one of the films that was produced by his production banner, Punch Productions.

The movie is described by critic Roger Ebert as "one of the great scare stories of our time, the notion that deep in the uncharted rain forests, deadly diseases are lurking, and if they ever escape their jungle homes and enter the human bloodstream, there will be a new plague the likes of which we have never seen." Critic David Denby credits Hoffman with giving the movie much of its thriller-like quality:

Following that, he appeared in the 1996 revenge drama/legal thriller Sleepers (1996) with Robert De Niro, Brad Pitt, Jason Patric, and Kevin Bacon.

In the mid-1990s, Hoffman starred in—and was deeply involved in the production of—David Mamet's American Buffalo (also 1996), and an early effort of film editor Kate Sanford. In 1997, Hoffman starred opposite John Travolta in the Costa Gavras film Mad City.

Hoffman gained his seventh Academy Award nomination for his performance in Wag The Dog (1997), in a role that allowed Hoffman the chance to work with both Robert De Niro and Denis Leary. The movie is a black comedy film produced and directed by Barry Levinson, who also directed Hoffman in Rain Man in 1988.

The story takes place a few days before a presidential election, where a Washington, D.C. spin doctor (De Niro) distracts the electorate from a sex scandal by hiring a Hollywood film producer (Hoffman) to construct a fake war with Albania. Hoffman, as a caricature of real life producer Robert Evans, according to some, "gives the kind of wonderfully funny performance that is liable to win prizes, especially since its mixture of affection and murderous parody is so precise. Stanley (Hoffman) conducts business meetings in tennis clothes or in robe and slippers", notes critic Janet Maslin.

He next appeared in another Barry Levinson film, the science fiction psychological thriller, Sphere (1998), opposite Sharon Stone.

In 1999, Hoffman received the AFI Life Achievement Award and recalls the emotional impact that receiving the award had on him:

2000s

Hoffman next appeared in Moonlight Mile (2002), followed by Confidence (2003) opposite Edward Burns, Andy García and Rachel Weisz. Hoffman finally had a chance to work with Gene Hackman in Gary Fleder's Runaway Jury (also 2003), an adaptation of John Grisham's bestselling novel.

Hoffman played theater owner Charles Frohman in the J. M. Barrie historical fantasia Finding Neverland (2004), costarring Johnny Depp and Kate Winslet. In director David O. Russell's I Heart Huckabees (also 2004), Hoffman appeared opposite Lily Tomlin as an existential detective team member. In 2001, his Punch Productions company went to a first look deal with The Walt Disney Studios.

Seven years after his nomination for Wag the Dog, Hoffman got another opportunity to perform again with Robert De Niro, co-starring with Streisand and Ben Stiller in the 2004 comedy Meet the Fockers, a sequel to Meet the Parents (2000). Hoffman won the 2005 MTV Movie Award for Best Comedic Performance. In 2005, he voiced a horse in Racing Stripes, and appeared in cameo roles in Andy García's The Lost City and on the final episode of HBO sitcom Curb Your Enthusiasms fifth season. Hoffman appeared in Stranger than Fiction (2006), played the perfumer Giuseppe Baldini in Tom Tykwer's film Perfume: The Story of a Murderer (also 2006).

In 2007, he was featured in an advertising campaign for Australian telecommunications company Telstra's Next G network, appeared in the 50 Cent video "Follow My Lead" as a psychiatrist, and played the title character in the British family film Mr. Magorium's Wonder Emporium for which he was nominated for a BIFA Award for Best Performance by an Actor in a British Independent Film at the British Independent Film Awards 2007. In 2008, although he was reluctant to perform in an animated feature film (Although he had previously performed voices in a version of The Point! and in an episode of The Simpsons), Hoffman had a prominent role as Shifu in the film Kung Fu Panda, which was praised in part for his comedic chemistry with Jack Black (whom he tutored in acting for an important scene) and his character's poignantly complex relationship with the story's villain. He later won the Annie Award for Voice Acting in an Animated Feature for Kung Fu Panda and has continued into the role in the franchise's subsequent filmed productions outside of the franchise's television series. He next voiced Roscuro in The Tale of Despereaux.

As the title character in Last Chance Harvey, Hoffman acted with co-star Emma Thompson in the story of two lonely people who tentatively forge a relationship over the course of three days. Director Joel Hopkins notes that Hoffman was a perfectionist and self-critical: "He often wanted to try things stripped down, because less is sometimes more. He worries about every little detail."

2010s
He appears in Little Fockers, the critically panned yet financially successful 2010 sequel to Meet the Fockers. However, his character plays a significantly smaller role than in the previous installment.

In 2011, Hoffman reprised his role as Master Shifu in the commercially and critically successful animated film Kung Fu Panda 2. On the review aggregator site Rotten Tomatoes, the film has an approval rating of 81% based on 169 reviews, and an average rating of 6.9/10. The site's critical consensus reads, "The storyline arc may seem a tad familiar to fans of the original, but Kung Fu Panda 2 offers enough action, comedy, and visual sparkle to compensate." On another aggregator site, Metacritic, the film has a weighted average score of 67 out of 100 based on 31 critics, indicating "generally favorable reviews". The film was a financial success making more money than the previous film, Kung Fu Panda. The film made $666 million at the worldwide Box Office. The film was also nominated for the Academy Award for Best Animated Feature.

In 2012, Hoffman's audiobook recording of Jerzy Kosinski's Being There was released at Audible.com. Hoffman starred in the HBO horse racing drama Luck, as a man involved in bookmaking and casino operations. Luck was canceled in March 2012 after three horses died on set.

In 2012, Hoffman made his directorial debut with Quartet, starring Maggie Smith, Tom Courtenay, Pauline Collins, Billy Connolly, and Michael Gambon.
The BBC comedy-drama premiered at the 2012 Toronto Film Festival where it earned respectable reviews from critics. The film is certified fresh on Rotten Tomatoes, earning an 80%, with the critical consensus reading, "It's sweet, gentle, and predictable to a fault, but Dustin Hoffman's affectionate direction and the talented cast's amiable charm make Quartet too difficult to resist." Smith was nominated for Golden Globe for her performance.

In 2015, Hoffman starred in Roald Dahl's Esio Trot, a BBC television film adaptation of Roald Dahl's classic novel, adapted by Richard Curtis and co-starring Judi Dench. Hoffman received an Emmy Award for Best Performance by an Actor.

In 2017, Hoffman starred in Noah Baumbach's Netflix film The Meyerowitz Stories alongside Adam Sandler, Ben Stiller, Elizabeth Marvel and Emma Thompson. The film premiered at the Cannes Film Festival on May 21, 2017, where it received a four-minute standing ovation.
The film received a 97% on Rotten Tomatoes, with the consensus reading, "The Meyerowitz Stories (New and Selected) observes the family dynamic through writer-director Noah Baumbach's bittersweet lens and the impressive efforts of a remarkable cast".

In 2017, Hoffman was honored with the Gotham Awards Tribute alongside Sofia Coppola, Nicole Kidman, Edward Lachman. Hoffman was introduced by Elizabeth Marvel.

2020s
In 2020, it was announced that Hoffman would make his return to the Broadway stage in Scott Rudin's revival of Our Town as the Stage Manager. Hoffman's last appearance on stage was 30 years prior in Death of a Salesman in 1989. Due to the COVID-19 pandemic, Broadway theaters remained shut until 2021.

Hoffman appeared alongside Candice Bergen, Dianna Agron and Simon Helberg in As They Made Us directed by Mayim Bialik. He also starred alongside Sissy Spacek and his son Jake Hoffman in Darren Le Gallo's directorial film debut Sam & Kate  which began filming in February 2022. In September 2021, he was attached to feature comedy film Mr. Shaw Goes To Hollywood as co-founder of MGM studio, Louis B Mayer. Filming would tentatively commence fall 2021.

In October 2022, Hoffman was cast in Francis Ford Coppola's latest film Megalopolis.

Filmography

Honors and legacy
 
In 1999, Hoffman was honored by the American Film Institute, who celebrated him with the 27th Life Achievement Award. Those who praised him and celebrated his work included, Edward Norton, Jon Voight, Goldie Hawn, Cuba Gooding Jr., and Kathy Bates. Jack Nicholson presented Hoffman with the award. Upon receiving the award he quoted the poet Emily Dickinson, "Not knowing when the dawn will come, I open the door".

In 2009, Hoffman received an Honorary Cesar Medal at the César Awards. In 2012, Dustin Hoffman received Kennedy Center Honors, with the following commendation: "Dustin Hoffman's unyielding commitment to the wide variety of roles he plays has made him one of the most versatile and iconoclastic actors of this or any other generation". Those who honored him at the ceremony included Robert De Niro, Liev Schreiber, Naomi Watts, and Billy Connolly.

In 2017, the Gotham Awards announced that they would recognize Hoffman for his lifetime achievement in film. The director of the Independent Filmmaker Project or (IFP) and Made in NY Media Center stated, "We are thrilled to present Dustin Hoffman with the Actor Tribute. Starting with his breakthrough role in the timeless classic The Graduate to his highly praised turn in his upcoming film, The Meyerowitz Stories, Dustin's wide range of roles – often portraying antiheroes or the marginalized – and the creative choices he has embodied in these complex characters, has firmly placed him amongst the most compelling actors to have graced the screen."

Actress Elizabeth Marvel introduced Hoffman where she talked about the influence he's had over her career and stated, "His work is never anything less than extraordinary".

Personal life

Marriage and relationships

Hoffman said that, when they were young and single, he and fellow actor and close friend Robert Duvall were "obsessed with sex". Hoffman related, "As acting students, there were always a few models. One comes up to you and says, "Hi," like you've never looked at her, while for six months you've been imagining her in bed with you. And she says, "I'd like to do a scene with you," and, whoa, she picks a love scene, and you're rehearsing and it's "Yes!" That happened to me and to Bobby. Much as we were adherents to our craft, we looked for classes with women."

After meeting in 1963, Hoffman married Anne Byrne in May 1969. He adopted Karina (b. 1966), Byrne's child from a previous marriage, and with Byrne had daughter Jenna (born October 15, 1970). In 1970, Hoffman and Byrne were living in Greenwich Village in a building next door to a townhouse occupied at the time by members of the Weathermen, when a bomb was accidentally detonated in the townhouse's basement, killing three. In the 2002 documentary The Weather Underground, Hoffman can be seen standing in the street during the aftermath of the explosion. The couple divorced in 1980.

After Hoffman's separation, he began seeing Lisa Gottsegen, their families having had a relationship together growing up. She was finishing her Juris Doctor degree, and the couple married in October 1980.  They have four children: Jacob Edward (born March 20, 1981), Rebecca Lillian (b. March 17, 1983), Maxwell Geoffrey (born August 30, 1984), and Alexandra Lydia "Ali" (born October 27, 1987). Hoffman has two grandchildren. 

In an interview, he said that all of his children from his second marriage had bar or bat mitzvahs and that he is a more observant Jew now than when he was younger. He has also lamented that he is not fluent in Hebrew.

Political activism
A liberal, Hoffman has long supported the Democratic Party and Ralph Nader. In 1997 he was one of a number of Hollywood stars and executives to sign an open letter to then-German chancellor Helmut Kohl protesting the treatment of Scientologists in Germany, which was published as a newspaper advertisement in the International Herald Tribune.

Cancer treatment
Hoffman was successfully treated for cancer in 2013.

Sexual misconduct allegations
In 2017, seven women accused Hoffman of sexual misconduct or assault. A woman who was 17 at the time alleged that, while working as an intern on a TV production of Death of a Salesman, Hoffman made inappropriate jokes and comments around her and asked her to give him foot massages. Hoffman released an apology to the 17-year-old intern who alleged harassment but denied wrongdoing, saying, "I have the utmost respect for women and feel terrible that anything I might have done could have put her in an uncomfortable situation", continuing, "I am sorry. It is not reflective of who I am." Online magazine Slate reported in 2017 that Meryl Streep had said that Hoffman groped her breast on their first meeting. However, a representative for Meryl Streep responded to Slate saying it was not an accurate rendering of their 1979 meeting. Streep's representative stated "there was an offense and it is something for which Dustin apologized. And Meryl accepted that."  Streep has also referred to an incident when Hoffman slapped her—rather than pantomiming a slap—while filming a scene in Kramer vs. Kramer.

In December 2017, comedian John Oliver unexpectedly interrogated Hoffman about the allegations during the 20th anniversary screening of Wag the Dog at the 92nd Street Y. "It's 'not reflective of who I am' – it's that kind of response to this stuff that pisses me off," Oliver said. "Do you understand how that feels like a dismissal?" Hoffman said he felt blindsided by the line of questioning, remarking "You've made the case better than anyone else can. I'm guilty. Because someone has alleged something, I'm guilty. You push a button. It's all over the world: I'm a predator. I'm this and that, and it's not true."

Hoffman has not publicly responded to the other six allegations.

Bill Murray, who costarred with Hoffman in Tootsie (1982) and The Lost City (2005), defended him, saying, "I heard what happened to him, and Dustin Hoffman is a really decent person. He's crazy, a Borscht Belt flirt, has been his whole life. (But) he's a really sweet man."  Actors 
Chevy Chase and Liam Neeson also came to his defense.

See also 
List of actors with Academy Award nominations
List of actors with two or more Academy Award nominations in acting categories
List of actors with two or more Academy Awards in acting categories

References

External links

 
 
 

1937 births
Living people
20th-century American male actors
21st-century American male actors
AFI Life Achievement Award recipients
American Ashkenazi Jews
American male comedy actors
American male film actors
American male stage actors
American male television actors
American male voice actors
American people of Romanian-Jewish descent
American people of Russian-Jewish descent
Annie Award winners
BAFTA Most Promising Newcomer to Leading Film Roles winners
Best Actor Academy Award winners
Best Actor BAFTA Award winners
Best Drama Actor Golden Globe (film) winners
Best Miniseries or Television Movie Actor Golden Globe winners
Best Musical or Comedy Actor Golden Globe (film) winners
Best Supporting Actor Genie and Canadian Screen Award winners
California Democrats
Cecil B. DeMille Award Golden Globe winners
César Honorary Award recipients
David di Donatello winners
Drama Desk Award winners
Film directors from Los Angeles
Honorary Golden Bear recipients
International Emmy Award for Best Actor winners
Jewish American male actors
Kennedy Center honorees
Los Angeles High School alumni
Male actors from California
Method actors
Neighborhood Playhouse School of the Theatre alumni
New Star of the Year (Actor) Golden Globe winners
Obie Award recipients
Outstanding Performance by a Lead Actor in a Miniseries or Movie Primetime Emmy Award winners
Royal Shakespeare Company members
Santa Monica College alumni
Theatre World Award winners
American people of Ukrainian-Jewish descent